Hypnos is a 2004 Spanish horror and psychological drama film directed by  (in his directorial debut feature) which stars Cristina Brondo alongside Demián Bichir, Féodor Atkine, and Natalia Sánchez.

Plot 
Set in a hi-tech psychiatric institution, the plot follows Beatriz Vargas, a young psychiatrist specialised in hypnosis who pits herself into the brink of madness upon trying to help a traumatised girl.

Cast

Production 
The film is a DeAPlaneta PC production, and it had the participation of TVE, Canal+, and TVE.

Release 
Distributed by United International Pictures, the film was theatrically released in Spain on 8 October 2004.

Reception 
Casimiro Torreiro of El País assessed that the film "requires patience", as viewers will be rewarded in the last third of the film insofar they do not let themselves "be carried away by primary emotions and remain attentive", despite the "often ridiculous dalliances of Dr. Vargas".

Jonathan Holland of Variety deemed the film to be an "above-average psychodrama with a generally solid script cobbled together from the leftovers of David Fincher and M. Night Shamayalan".

See also 
 List of Spanish films of 2004

References 

2000s psychological drama films
2000s psychological horror films
Spanish horror films
Films set in psychiatric hospitals
2000s Spanish films
2004 horror films
2004 drama films
2000s Spanish-language films
2004 directorial debut films
Films based on Spanish novels